Gasparo Cecchinelli (1587–1666) was a Roman Catholic prelate who served as Bishop of Corneto e Montefiascone (1630–1666) and Apostolic Nuncio to Savoy (1641–1644).

Biography
Gasparo Cecchinelli was born in Sarzana, Italy in 1587.

On 13 May 1630, he was appointed by Pope Urban VIII as Bishop of Corneto e Montefiascone. The diocese had previously been held by his uncle, Cardinal Paolo Emilio Zacchia, and then by his uncle Cardinal Laudivio Zacchia (1605–1630). During the tenure of the diocese by Laudivio Zacchia, Cecchinelli served as his Vicar General in diocesan administration. On 20 May 1630, he was consecrated bishop by Laudivio Zacchia, Cardinal-Priest of San Pietro in Vincoli. The two cardinals and their nephew were responsible for the building of the façade of the cathedral of Montefiascone.

On 4 May 1641, he was appointed by Pope Urban VIII as Apostolic Nuncio to Savoy. He resigned as Apostolic Nuncio to Savoy in April 1644.

He served as Bishop of Corneto e Montefiascone until his death on 7 March 1666. It is said that he was unsteady in his administration of justice, proceeding arbitrarily and without regard to process.

Episcopal succession
While bishop, he was the principal co-consecrator of:
Raffaele Pizzorno, Bishop of Sagone (1640); and 
Alessandro Porro, Bishop of Bobbio (1650).

References

External links and additional sources
 (for Chronology of Bishops) 
 (for Chronology of Bishops) 
 (for Chronology of Bishops) 

17th-century Italian Roman Catholic bishops
Bishops appointed by Pope Urban VIII
1587 births
1666 deaths
Apostolic Nuncios to Savoy